Lech Antoni Kołakowski (born 13 June 1963 in Zambrów) is a Polish politician. He was elected to the Sejm on 25 September 2005, getting 6,373 votes in 24 Białystok district as a candidate from the Law and Justice list. He left the party in November 2020.

See also
Members of Polish Sejm 2005–2007

References

External links
Lech Kołakowski - parliamentary page - includes declarations of interest, voting record, and transcripts of speeches.

1963 births
Living people
People from Zambrów
Law and Justice politicians
Members of the Polish Sejm 2005–2007
Members of the Polish Sejm 2007–2011
Members of the Polish Sejm 2011–2015
Alumni of the University of Warwick
Polish city councillors
Centre Agreement politicians